Death Comes as the End is a historical mystery novel by Agatha Christie, first published in the US by Dodd, Mead and Company in October 1944 and in the UK by the Collins Crime Club in March of the following year. The US Edition retailed at $2.00 and the UK edition at seven shillings and sixpence (7/6).

It is the only one of Christie's novels not to be set in the 20th century, and - unusually for her - also features no European characters. Instead, the novel is set in Thebes in 2000 BC, a setting for which Christie gained an appreciation whilst working with her archaeologist husband, Sir Max Mallowan, in the Middle East. The novel is notable for its very high number of deaths and is comparable to And Then There Were None from this standpoint. It is also the first full-length novel combining historical fiction and the whodunit/detective story, a genre which would later come to be called the historical whodunit.

The suggestion to base the story in ancient Egypt came from noted Egyptologist and family friend Stephen Glanville. He also assisted Christie with details of daily household life in Egypt 4000 years ago. In addition he made forceful suggestions to Christie to change the ending of the book. This she did but regretted the fact afterwards, feeling that her (unpublished) ending was better. The novel is based on real letters translated by egyptologist Battiscombe Gunn, from the Egyptian Middle Kingdom period, written by a man called Heqanakhte to his family, complaining about their behaviour and treatment of his concubine.

It is one of only four Christie novels to have not received an adaptation of any kind, the others being Destination Unknown, Passenger to Frankfurt and Postern of Fate.

Christie uses a theme for her chapter titles, as she did for many of her novels, in this case the Egyptian agricultural calendar.

Plot introduction
The quiet lives of an Egyptian family are disturbed when the father, Imhotep, returns from the north with his new concubine, Nofret, who begins to sow discontent amongst them. Once the deaths begin, fears are aroused of a curse upon the house, but is the killer closer to home?

Plot summary
The novel is primarily written from the perspective of Renisenb, a young widow reacquainting herself with her family when her father Imhotep, a successful but pompous and short-sighted mortuary priest, brings a new "wife", Nofret, into their lives. Nofret soon disrupts and antagonises Imhotep's sons - Yahmose, Sobek and Ipy - as well as their wives. Renisenb realises the housekeeper Henet, while feigning devotion, is full of hatred. She confronts Henet near the end of the story, who in a fit of pique admits she hates Renisenb and hated Renisenb's long-deceased mother.

After Imhotep is called away, Satipy and Kait, the elder sons' wives, try to bully Nofret with tricks, but the plan backfires when Nofret appeals to Imhotep and he threatens to disown his sons and their families upon his return. Suddenly everyone has a motive to kill Nofret and when she is found dead at the foot of a cliff, an accident seems unlikely, although no one will acknowledge anything else.

Next, Satipy falls to her death in terror from the same cliff while walking with Yahmose. Renisenb, and others, wonder if it was Nofret's vengeful spirit that she was looking at over Yahmose's shoulder moments before her death. This theory gathers force when Yahmose and Sobek drink poisoned wine. Sobek dies, but Yahmose lingers on, having drunk less of the wine. A slave boy who says he saw Nofret's ghost poisoning the wine dies of poison shortly afterwards.

The handsome scribe Kameni has fallen in love with Renisenb, and eventually asks her to marry him. Unsure whether she loves him or her father's advisor Hori, whom she has known since she was a child, she leaves the choice effectively in her father's hands and becomes engaged to Kameni. She realises, however, that his relationship with Nofret was closer than she had supposed, and that jealousy may have influenced Nofret's bitter hatred towards the family. Hori and Esa, the elderly mother of Imhotep (a clever woman who although almost completely blind sees things clearer than most others - especially her son) begin to investigate the possibility of a human murderer. Ipy, himself a likely suspect, starts to boast about his new, better position with his father; he plots to get rid of housekeeper Henet and tells her so. The next morning, Ipy is found dead in the lake, drowned.

The field of suspects has been further narrowed. Esa attempts to flush out the murderer by dropping a hint about the death of Satipy, but is herself murdered by means of poisoned unguent, despite the presence of a food taster. Henet - who knows the murderer's identity and is momentarily powerful amid the chaos - is smothered by the linens used to wrap the ever-increasing number of victims.

On the same cliff path where Nofret and Satipy died, Renisenb, apparently summoned by Hori, hears footsteps behind her and turns to see Yahmose. She then sees the look of murderous hatred in her brother's eyes that Satipy saw before she was killed. As Renisenb is about to be killed, however, Hori slays Yahmose with an arrow and saves her. Hori explains to Renisenb that Satipy was not looking in fear at anything beyond Yahmose — she was looking straight at him. He had consumed a non-lethal dose of poison and pretended to recuperate while committing murders, both to make himself chief heir and to indulge his newfound love of violence. Renisenb's final choice is whom to marry: Kameni, a lively husband not unlike her first, or Hori, an older and more enigmatic figure. She makes her choice and falls into Hori's arms.

Characters in Death Comes as the End
 Imhotep, a mortuary priest
 Nofret, Imhotep's concubine from the north
 Esa, Imhotep's mother
 Yahmose, Imhotep's eldest son
 Satipy, Yahmose's wife
 Ipy, Imhotep's youngest son
 Renisenb, Imhotep's daughter
 Sobek, Imhotep's second son
 Kait, Sobek's wife
 Henet, obsequious family retainer, poor relation of Ashayet, Imhotep's deceased wife 
 Hori, the family's scribe
 Kameni, a scribe from the North
 Teti, Renisenb's daughter
 Khay, Renisenb's late husband

Literary significance and reception
Maurice Willson Disher said in The Times Literary Supplement of 28 April 1945 that, "When a specialist acquires unerring skill there is a temptation to find tasks that are exceptionally difficult. The scenes of Death Comes as the End are laid out in Ancient Egypt. They are painted delicately. The household of the priest, who is depicted not as a sacred personage, but as a humdrum landowner, makes an instant appeal because its members are human. But while the author's skill can cause a stir over the death of an old woman some thousands of years ago, that length of time lessens curiosity concerning why or how she (and others) died."

Maurice Richardson, a self-proclaimed admirer of Christie, wrote in the 8 April 1945 issue of The Observer, "One of the best weeks of the war for crime fiction. First, of course, the new Agatha Christie; Death Comes as the End. And it really is startlingly new, with its ancient Egyptian setting in the country household of a mortuary priest who overstrains his already tense family by bringing home an ultra-tough live in concubine from Memphis. Result:  a series of murders. With her special archaeological equipment, Mrs Christie makes you feel just as much at home on the Nile in 1945 B.C. as if she were bombarding you with false clues in a chintz-covered drawing room in Leamington Spa. But she has not merely changed scenes; her reconstruction is vivid and she works really hard at her characters. My already insensate admiration for her leaps even higher."

In 1990 the novel was included in Crime Writers' Associations' The Top 100 Crime Novels of All Time list.    

Robert Barnard: "Hercule Poirot's Christmas, transported to Egypt, ca 2000 B.C. Done with tact, yet the result is somehow skeletal - one realises how much the average Christie depends on trappings: clothes, furniture, the paraphernalia of bourgeois living. The culprit in this one is revealed less by detection than by a process of elimination."

Publication history

1944, US, Dodd & Mead, October 1944, hardback (First US edition), 223 pp
1945, UK, The Crime Club Collins, March 1945, hardback (First UK edition), 160 pp
1947, Pocket Books (New York), Paperback, (Pocket number 465), 179 pp
1953, Penguin Books, Paperback, (Penguin number 926), 188 pp
1960, Fontana Books (Imprint of HarperCollins), Paperback, 191 pp
1957, Pan Books, Paperback, 221 pp
1975, Ulverscroft Large-print Edition, Hardcover, 334 pp

Planned Adaptation
A BBC adaptation of the novel was announced in August 2016, as part of a sequence of Christie productions. Gwyneth Hughes was announced as the adaptation's writer in December 2018, with broadcast planned for 2019. However, no further news on the adaptation was subsequently revealed.

References

External links
Death Comes as the End at the official Agatha Christie website

1944 British novels
Novels by Agatha Christie
Novels set in ancient Egypt
Fiction set in the 21st century BC
Dodd, Mead & Co. books
Historical mystery novels